The 1956 United States presidential election in Rhode Island took place on November 6, 1956, as part of the 1956 United States presidential election which was held throughout all contemporary 48 states. Voters chose four representatives, or electors to the Electoral College, who voted for president and vice president. 

Rhode Island voted for the Republican nominee, incumbent President Dwight D. Eisenhower of Pennsylvania, over the Democratic nominee, former Governor Adlai Stevenson of Illinois. Eisenhower ran with incumbent Vice President Richard Nixon of California, while Stevenson's running mate was Senator Estes Kefauver of Tennessee.

Eisenhower won Rhode Island by a margin of  16.53%. This is also the most recent presidential election when Rhode Island would vote more Republican than the nation as a whole. Eisenhower's 225,819 votes is the most received by a Republican presidential candidate in the state's history. Eisenhower is also the last Republican to carry the state twice, as starting in 1960, Rhode Island would become reliably Democratic. In fact, it has only voted for the party on two more occasions, both amidst 49-state Republican landslides nationally. 

As of 2020, this was the last election in which a Republican presidential candidate won the cities of Central Falls and Pawtucket. This is also the most recent time that a Republican has won a majority of the vote in Providence County.

Results

By county

See also
 United States presidential elections in Rhode Island

References

Rhode Island
1956
1956 Rhode Island elections